Sigar-e Bala (also Romanized as Sīgār-e Bālā and Sigar Bala; also known as Sīgār, Sīgār-e ‘Olyā, Sīgār-e Pā’īn, and Sīgār-e Soflá) is a village in Sigar Rural District, in the Central District of Lamerd County, Fars Province, Iran. At the 2006 census, its population was 1,078, in 243 families.

References 

Populated places in Lamerd County